The 1959 Paris–Roubaix was the 57th edition of the Paris–Roubaix, a classic one-day cycle race in France. The single day event was held on 12 April 1959 and stretched  from Paris to the finish at Roubaix Velodrome. The winner was Noël Foré from Belgium.

Results

References

1959
1959 in road cycling
1959 in French sport
April 1959 sports events in Europe
1959 Super Prestige Pernod